The Seven Islands Archeological and Historic District encompasses a  site near the confluence of the James and Slate Rivers in Buckingham and Fluvanna Counties in Virginia.  The site is notable for a number of prehistoric archaeological sites, the largest of which is a Woodland period Native American site, while smaller sites from earlier periods also exist in the area.  The site is also notable for the Seven Islands house, a well-preserved Greek Revival I-house.  It is situated on a bluff in Buckingham County with commanding views of the James River, across from the Bremo Plantation.

The district was listed on the National Register of Historic Places in 1991.

References

National Register of Historic Places in Buckingham County, Virginia
National Register of Historic Places in Fluvanna County, Virginia
Greek Revival houses in Virginia
Buildings and structures completed in 1847
Archaeological sites on the National Register of Historic Places in Virginia
I-houses in Virginia
Historic districts on the National Register of Historic Places in Virginia
1847 establishments in Virginia